Agim Meto (born 2 February 1986) is an Albanian professional footballer who plays as a midfielder for Apolonia Fier in the Albanian Superliga.

Club career

Early career
He has previously played for Apolonia Fier and Flamurtari Vlorë, and he was loaned out to Besa Kavajë in 2008 from Apolonia Fier for the club's UEFA Intertoto Cup campaign, in which he played in both legs in a second round fixture against Swiss side Grasshopper Zurich

Bylis Ballsh
On 29 December 2011, Meto agreed personal terms and completed a transfer to Bylis Ballsh as a free agent.

Flamurtari Vlorë
Meto left Flamurtari Vlorë during a mass exodus at the club, which saw most of the first team players replaced in the January transfer window of 2015. He left the club after not impressing manager Ernestino Ramella.

Laçi
Following his release by Flamurtari Vlorë, Meto signed for another Albanian Superliga side KF Laçi in January 2015 and he immediately hit form as he scored 7 goals in his first 11 games in all competitions, 6 of which came in 9 league games. He announced his departure from the club in January 2016 after unilaterally terminating the contract to become a free agent.

Lushnja
On 20 July 2017, Meto returned to top flight by joining newly promoted side Lushnja by signing for the 2017–18 season. After not being used in the first four matches, Meto debuted on 12 October in the 0–2 away loss to Kukësi. He scored his first goal of campaign with a free-kick in a 2–1 away against the fellow relegation strugglers Vllaznia Shkodër on 22 November.

Apolonia Fier
On 14 September 2018, Meto agreed personal terms and inked a contract with his first club Apolonia, returning in Fier for the first time after seven seasons.

Career statistics

Honours
Laçi
Albanian Cup: 2014–15
Albanian Supercup: 2015

Luftëtari Gjirokastër
Albanian First Division: 2015–16

References

External links

Agim Meto at the Albanian Football Association

1986 births
Living people
Sportspeople from Fier
Albanian footballers
Association football midfielders
KF Apolonia Fier players
KF Bylis Ballsh players
Besa Kavajë players
Flamurtari Vlorë players
KF Laçi players
Luftëtari Gjirokastër players
KS Lushnja players
Kategoria Superiore players
Kategoria e Parë players